Sir Richard Hughes Trainor,  (born 31 December 1948), is an academic administrator and historian who served as the Principal of King's College London from 2004 to 2014. He was previously the Vice-Chancellor of the University of Greenwich from 2000 to 2004.  He is currently Rector of Exeter College, Oxford.

Trainor was born in the United States. He was awarded an honorary knighthood (KBE) in June 2010 for services to higher education in the United Kingdom. The award was honorary because of his American nationality, but on 31 December 2010 the knighthood was made substantive by Queen Elizabeth II following his assumption of British nationality.

Biography
Trainor was educated at Calvert Hall College High School in Towson, Maryland, in the United States. He graduated from Brown University with a BA summa cum laude in American Civilization. He subsequently earned MAs from Princeton University and from Merton College, Oxford, before completing his D.Phil. in 1981 at Nuffield College, Oxford, entitled "Authority and social structure in an industrialized area: A study of three Black Country towns, 1840–1890". He is a former Rhodes Scholar.

He is a fellow of the Academy of Social Sciences, Fellow of the Royal Historical Society and a member of the Athenaeum Club. He is also an Honorary Fellow of Merton College, Oxford, and Trinity College of Music, and a member of the Anglo-American Fulbright Commission.

Trainor is currently the President of the Economic History Society. He holds honorary degrees from the University of Kent (since 2009); the Rosalind Franklin University of Medicine and Science (since 2012); and the University of Glasgow (since 2014).

He has been Emeritus professor of Social History at King's College London since 2014, and was a member of the Arts and Humanities Research Council from 2006 to 2011. He is an honorary fellow of the Institute of Historical Research.

As a result of his work with King's College London, the institution established a scholarship in his name, the Professor Sir Richard Trainor Postgraduate Research Scholarship, in 2014.

Family
He is married to Marguerite Dupree, an academic historian of medicine currently at Glasgow University. They have two children.

Career

Trainor was Vice-Chancellor of the University of Greenwich (2000–2004). Prior to this appointment, he was Senior Vice-Principal of the University of Glasgow. In 2004 Trainor became Principal of King's College London, where he is also Professor of Social History. In 2009 the title of President of King's was added.

Between 2007 and 2009 Rick served as President of Universities UK (UUK), the organisation that represents the heads of all UK Universities. In this role he engaged with the new Department of Innovation, Universities and Skills and latterly, the successor Department of Business, Innovation and Skills, on a wide range of issues including autonomy, funding, research, standards and immigration. He served on the Confederation of British Industries' Higher Education Task Force from 2008–2009.

Since becoming Principal of King's in 2004, Trainor has overseen the promotion of the College from 96th to 19th place in the QS World University Rankings (2015/16), making it the 5th ranked UK university. 
In 2010 King's was named UK Sunday Times University of the Year. According to 2014's Research Excellence Framework (REF), the academic institution rose 15 places since its last assessment in 2008, climbing on grade point average to reach seventh place.

Trainor oversaw the College's role in the creation of King's Health Partners in 2009, an academic health science centre, in which King's College London collaborates with Guy's and St Thomas's Hospitals, King's College Hospital and South London and Maudsley NHS Foundation Trusts. He also oversaw the joining King's College London with the Francis Crick Institute in 2011.

During Trainor's tenure, in 2009 King's acquired the East Wing of Somerset House, after 180 years of intermittent negotiations between King's and Somerset House Trust. Somerset House East Wing was opened by Her Majesty The Queen in February 2012.

Under Trainor's leadership, the College launched King's Cultural Institute, enhancing ties to a number of nearby national cultural institutions.

Trainor received the Annual Leadership Award of the Council for the Advancement and Support of Education in June 2011 for his role in the College's fundraising and for alumni relations.

Trainor has overseen the establishment of a number of Global Institutes – the Brazil Institute, the Russia Institute, the India Institute and the China Institute – at the College as part of greater focus on internationalisation at King's. These centres of research and study aim to focus on contemporary developments in fast-changing parts of the world.

In March 2012 Trainor was invited to join the IPPR Commission on the Future of Higher Education.  In May 2012 HEFCE announced it was to undertake a Review of Philanthropic Support for Higher Education throughout the UK and Trainor sat on the review board.

In June 2013 Exeter College, Oxford announced that Trainor was the preferred candidate to succeed Frances Cairncross as rector. The College announced his formal pre-election in October 2013. Trainor took office on 1 October 2014, during the College’s 700th anniversary year. The Rector is Head of the College with oversight of all its activities.  He and Exeter’s 48 Fellows constitute the Governing Body (chaired by the Rector).  The Governing Body is responsible for Exeter’s staff, its student population of c.325 undergraduates and c.200 postgraduates, its finances and its buildings.  A key current project is the completion – scheduled for summer 2016 – of Exeter’s Cohen Quadrangle, on Walton Street in central Oxford, the College’s largest single physical expansion in its 701-year history.

Trainor is also governor of the Royal Academy of Music  and the Museum of London (as of June 2014).

Restructuring at King's College London, 2010 and 2014
During his tenure at King's College London, the institution announced a restructure of its funding. The plans had a negative reception in the press and in the educational field.

The University and College Union (UCU) and the British Medical Association (BMA) voiced their concerns about the restructuring at King's College London. The situation at King's attracted national press coverage.

Trainor responded by highlighting the pressures facing UK Universities and giving an interview to The Times about the challenges of funding cuts and his belief that further higher education funding cuts would risk serious damage to the sector.

Further, the institution's decision to close the Division of Engineering in 2009, was criticised for risking charges of "reckless academic vandalism". However, King’s has developed a research and teaching programme in Biomedical Engineering, assisted by a grant (under the programme of Centres of Excellence in Medical Engineering) from the Wellcome Trust and the Engineering and Physical Sciences Research Council (EPSRC).

The university's choice of cuts was the subject of a House of Commons Early Day Motion in March 2010: "That this House notes the proposal by the Executive of King's College London as part of its budget review process to abolish the Chair of Palaeography, the only one of its kind in the United Kingdom; further notes the fundamental importance of palaeography to a broad and interdisciplinary scholarly community; considers that without the development of palaeographic skills, millions of documents would be rendered inaccessible, thus depriving the nation of its full historical legacy; and therefore urges King's College London to consider very carefully any proposals in respect to this prestigious and important Chair."

In January 2012, King's announced the appointment of Dr Julia Crick as Professor of Palaeography and Manuscript Studies in the School of Arts & Humanities.

Another proposal for restructuring was announced in May 2014. There was an adverse response in the media to the proposed changes.

The University and College Union have provided a regularly-updated list of media coverage. King's College London has also provided a list of rebuttal press statements.

Published works
 Black Country élites: the exercise of authority in an industrialised area, 1830–1900. Oxford: Clarendon Press, 1993.
 Urban governance: Britain and beyond since 1750, edited by Robert J. Morris and Richard H. Trainor.  Aldershot: Ashgate, 2000.
 University, city and state: the University of Glasgow since 1870, by Michael Moss, J. Forbes Munro and Richard H. Trainor.  Edinburgh: Edinburgh University Press for the University of Glasgow, 2000.

References

1948 births
Living people
Brown University alumni
Princeton University alumni
Alumni of Merton College, Oxford
Alumni of Nuffield College, Oxford
Principals of King's College London
Academics of King's College London
American Rhodes Scholars
American emigrants to the United Kingdom
Fellows of King's College London
Academics of the University of Oxford
Academics of the University of Glasgow
People associated with the University of Greenwich
Academics of the University of Greenwich
Fellows of the Royal Historical Society
Knights Commander of the Order of the British Empire
Fellows of the Academy of Social Sciences
Rectors of Exeter College, Oxford
Naturalised citizens of the United Kingdom
Fellows of Merton College, Oxford